Stefan Charles Parsons (born June 15, 1998) is an American professional stock car racing driver. He competes part-time in the NASCAR Xfinity Series, driving the Nos. 43 and 45 Chevrolet Camaros for Alpha Prime Racing. He has also raced in the NASCAR Craftsman Truck Series, ARCA Menards Series and the CARS Tour in the past.

Racing career

Early career
Stefan began racing at age 12 after his father Phil received encouragement from Ken Ragan.

CARS Late Model Stock Tour
Parsons began racing in the CARS Tour in 2015, where he drove the No. 98 Ford for his father’s team, Phil Parsons Racing, in five of the races.

He returned to the car in 2016, this time participating in eight of the ten races and finishing 12th in the overall points standings.

In 2017, Parsons drove the same car in six races, though the last one was in the No. 55 Ford.

Truck Series
Parsons made his NASCAR debut in the Truck Series in 2018, where he drove the No. 15 Chevrolet Silverado for Premium Motorsports at Bristol. He finished 17th after starting 30th. He would later return to the team for the Phoenix race, where he finished 20th after starting 24th.

In 2019, Parsons drove the No. 1 Chevrolet for Beaver Motorsports at Las Vegas. At Charlotte, he drove the No. 49 for CMI Motorsports with a paint scheme honoring the victims of the 2019 University of North Carolina at Charlotte shooting.

Parsons returned to CMI in 2020, driving a second No. 83 truck at Las Vegas.

After not running any Truck Series races in 2021, Parsons returned to the series in 2022 in the race at Sonoma as a last-minute replacement driver for G2G Racing. Mason Filippi and Travis McCullough were both scheduled to attempt to make their Truck Series debuts at Sonoma in the team's Nos. 46 and 47 trucks, respectively. However, on June 10, McCullough had to be replaced due to his drug test results not coming in in time for practice. (As it was his first start of the season, he had to take a drug test beforehand.) Parsons was announced as McCullough's replacement in the No. 47 truck for qualifying. However, on June 11, the team decided to move Parsons from the No. 47 and replacing McCullough to the No. 46 and replacing Filippi in qualifying and the race due to Filippi not adjusting to the truck well enough in practice. The No. 47 truck was withdrawn. Parsons then drove the No. 20 for Young's Motorsports in the race at Nashville.

Xfinity Series
In July 2019, Parsons ran his first NASCAR Xfinity Series race in the Circle K Firecracker 250 at Daytona International Speedway for B. J. McLeod Motorsports. Later in the year at the Charlotte Roval, he relieved Cody Ware mid-race when Ware was feeling unwell due to a damaged coolbox in his car.

Parsons ran nine races in 2020 with a best finish of 18th at Texas Motor Speedway. He returned to BJMM and the No. 99 for another part-time schedule in 2021.

On September 21, 2021, BJMM announced that Parsons would be driving full-time in the No. 99 for the team in 2022, with sponsorship from Sokal Digital and Springrates Automotive. However, he was reduced to an unknown amount of races, including one race in the No. 5 car, due to the No. 78 taking owner points from the No. 99. In addition, he would compete in Alpha Prime Racing's No. 45 for an excessive amount of races, which would be the first time he drove a team other than McLeod's team since 2019, in which he drove for JD Motorsports.

Personal life
Parsons is the son of Phil Parsons and the nephew of Benny Parsons.
 
He is the brother-in-law of fellow competitor Sheldon Creed as his twin sister Cami is married to him.

Motorsports career results

NASCAR
(key) (Bold – Pole position awarded by qualifying time. Italics – Pole position earned by points standings or practice time. * – Most laps led.)

Xfinity Series

 Season still in progress 
 Ineligible for series points

Camping World Truck Series

K&N Pro Series East

ARCA Menards Series
(key) (Bold – Pole position awarded by qualifying time. Italics – Pole position earned by points standings or practice time. * – Most laps led.)

References

External links
 
 

Living people
1998 births
NASCAR drivers
ARCA Menards Series drivers
Racing drivers from Charlotte, North Carolina
Racing drivers from North Carolina
CARS Tour drivers